Events from the year 1757 in France.

Incumbents 
Monarch: Louis XV

Events
 
 
 
 

 5 January – Robert-François Damiens makes an unsuccessful assassination attempt on Louis XV of France. On 28 March Damiens is publicly executed by dismemberment, the last person in France to suffer this punishment.
 14 March – Seven Years' War: British Admiral Sir John Byng is executed by firing squad aboard  for breach of the Articles of War in failing to "do his utmost" at the Battle of Minorca (1756).
 26 July – Seven Years' War – Battle of Hastenbeck: An Anglo-Hanoverian army under the Duke of Cumberland is defeated by the French under Louis d'Estrées and forced out of Hanover.
 3–9 August – French and Indian War: A French army under Louis-Joseph de Montcalm forces the English to surrender Fort William Henry. The French army's Indian allies slaughter the survivors for unclear reasons.
 5 November – Seven Years' War – Battle of Rossbach: Frederick defeats the French-Imperial army under the Duc de Soubise and Prince Joseph of Saxe-Hildburghausen, forcing the French to withdraw from Saxony.

Births
 6 September – Gilbert du Motier, Marquis de Lafayette, French soldier and statesman (d. 1834)
 9 October – Prince Charles, future King of France and grandson of reigning monarch Louis XV (d. 1836 in the Austrian Empire)
 21 October – Pierre Augereau, Marshal of France and duc de Castiglione (d. 1816)

Deaths
 

 17 October – René Antoine Ferchault de Réaumur, French scientist (b. 1683)
 9 January – Bernard Le Bovier de Fontenelle, French scientist and man of letters (b. 1657)
 25 October – Antoine Augustin Calmet, French theologian (b. 1672)

See also

References

1750s in France